Silas Albert Williamson (February 20, 1900 – November 29, 1978) was a Major League Baseball pitcher who played for one season. He pitched for the Chicago White Sox in one game, playing on April 27 during the 1928 Chicago White Sox season.

External links

1900 births
1978 deaths
Major League Baseball pitchers
Baseball players from Arkansas
Chicago White Sox players
Laurel Lumberjacks players